Ronald William Clarke, AO, MBE (21 February 1937 – 17 June 2015) was an Australian athlete, writer, and the Mayor of the Gold Coast from 2004 to 2012. He was one of the best-known middle- and long-distance runners in the 1960s, notable for setting seventeen world records.

Early life and family 
Clarke was born 21 February 1937 in Melbourne, Victoria. He attended Essendon Primary School, Essendon High School and Melbourne High School. His brother Jack Clarke and father Tom played Australian rules football in the Victorian Football League with Essendon. He was a qualified accountant.

In 1956, when Clarke was still a promising 19-year-old, he was chosen to light the Olympic Flame in the Melbourne Cricket Ground during the opening ceremonies of the 1956 Summer Olympics in Melbourne.

Athletic career 

He won the bronze medal in the 10,000 metre (m) race at the 1964 Summer Olympics when he was upset by Billy Mills, and never won an Olympic gold medal. However, Emil Zátopek gave him one of his own Gold medals, which Clarke described as one of his most cherished presents. At the 1968 Summer Olympics in Mexico City, Clarke collapsed and nearly died from altitude sickness sustained during the gruelling 10,000 m race final.  Despite training in the Alps to get acclimatised to high altitudes at Mexico City, this could not put him on par with many opponents from Africa, who had always run at high altitude (with the notable exception of 5,000 m gold medalist and 10,000 m bronze medalist Mohammed Gammoudi of Tunisia, who was born and lived not far above sea level).  Clarke finished in sixth place, but remembered nothing of the last lap. He recovered sufficiently to compete in the 5,000 metre heats a few days later.

During a 44-day European tour in 1965, he competed 18 times and broke 12 world records, including the 20,000 m (12.4 miles). On 10 July, at London's White City Stadium, he became the first man to run 3 miles in under 13 minutes, lowering the world record to 12:52.4. Four days later, in Oslo, he lowered his own 10,000 m world record by 36.2 seconds to 27:39.4, becoming the first man to break the 28 minute barrier.

World records

In 1965, Clarke beat the 10,000-metre world record in Turku, Finland, with a time of 28:14.0; however, it was never ratified, as it was said that permission to run was requested too late.

Political career 
He was elected Mayor of the Gold Coast, Queensland, in 2004, defeating the incumbent Gary Baildon. Clarke and his wife, Helen, first came to the Gold Coast for a holiday in 1957. The couple returned almost every year thereafter, and in 1995, after 14 years abroad, mainly in Europe, came back for good.

Clarke resigned as Mayor of the Gold Coast on 27 February 2012, when he announced his nomination to run as an independent candidate for the seat of Broadwater in the 2012 Queensland state election. Clarke failed in this campaign, coming fourth and recording only a 4.6% primary vote.

Former Australian Football League CEO Andrew Demetriou stated that Clarke as Mayor of the Gold Coast played a major role in the AFL establishing a new team Gold Coast Suns on the Gold Coast.

In 2011, Clarke was part of the lobbying team that secured the 2018 Commonwealth Games for the Gold Coast, Queensland.

Honours
In 1966, Clarke was appointed a Member of the Order of the British Empire (MBE) "In recognition of service to athletics".

In 2000, he was awarded the Australian Sports Medal for "Significant contribution as a competitor (Athletics)".

In 2001, he was awarded the Centenary Medal for "Distinguished service to the eco-tourism industry".

In the 2013 Queen's Birthday Honours List, he was appointed an Officer of the Order of Australia (AO) "for distinguished service to the community through a range of leadership roles with local government and philanthropic organisations, and to the promotion of athletics."

Awards and recognition 
 1965 – awarded the Prix Du President by the French Sports Academy
 1965 – Helms Award for Australasia
 1965 – ABC's Sportsman of the Year
 1965 – Track & Field News Male Athlete of the Year
 1965 – BBC Sportsman of the Year – Overseas Personality
 1965 – World Sportsman of the Year by the International Association of Sports Writers
 1982 – awarded Victorian Father of the Year.
 1985 – inaugural inductee into the Sport Australia Hall of Fame
 2000 – inaugural inductee  into the  Athletics Australia Hall of Fame in 2000.
 2022 - Sport Australia Hall of Fame Legend

In 2005, Geelong Athletics honoured Clarke with an athletics meet to commemorate the 40th anniversary of his breaking the world record for the 20,000 metres and his one-hour run at Landy Field in October 1965.  This meet is held annually as part of the Athletics Australia National Meet Series.

On 15 March 2006, Ron Clarke was one of the final four runners who carried the Queen's Baton around the MCG stadium during the 2006 Commonwealth Games Opening Ceremony in Melbourne, Victoria, Australia.

Emil Zátopek had great respect for Ron Clarke. In 1966 (often erroneously noted as 1968), he invited the Australian to Czechoslovakia, and as a parting gift he gave him his 1952 Olympic 10,000-metre gold medal with the following words: "Not out of friendship but because you deserve it."

Death
Clarke died of kidney failure on 17 June 2015 at Allamanda Hospital in Southport, Queensland. Clarke is survived by his wife Helen and sons Marcus and Nicolas. His daughter Monique died of breast cancer in 2009.

Prime Minister Tony Abbott and Opposition Leader Bill Shorten paid tribute to Clarke in Parliament on the day of his death by stating that a great Australian had been lost with his death. Herb Elliott, an Australian 1500-metre Olympic gold medallist, said "Ron was a great man. His contribution to athletics was enormous. He was also a wonderful contributor to public health through lifestyle programs and gymnasiums and the communities in which he lived. Ron will be greatly missed".
John Landy, who famously helped Clarke when he fell during a mile race at the 1956 Australian Championships, said, "Ron Clarke, by his running feats inspired Australian distance runners and in a world sense, demonstrated the potential athletics achievements possible." Frank Shorter, the 1972 Olympic marathon gold medallist, said: "Ron Clarke was my idol. I grew up seeing Ron Clarke in the dark blue singlet with the V on it – to me that was the symbol of running."

Bibliography
 The Measure of Success : a personal perspective. South Melbourne, Vic. : Lothian Books, 2004.
 Run Easy. Melbourne : Information Australia, 2001.
 Never Say Never : Couran Cove Resort from dream to reality. Avalon, N.S.W. : Banyan Tree Creative Services, 1999.
 Fixing the Olympics. Melbourne : Information Australia, 1999.
 Enjoying Life : a champion's guide to the good life. Melbourne : Information Australia, 1999. 
 Total Living : for everyone who wants to be fitter, trimmer and smarter. London : Pavilion, 1995. 
 Ron Clarke's Running Book.  Collingwood, Vic. : Outback Press, 1979.
 Successful Athletics : from beginner to expert in forty lessons, with Raelene Boyle. Melbourne : Thomas Nelson, 1976. 
 Ron Clarke Talks Track edited by Jon Hendershott. Los Altos, California : Tafnews, 1972. 
 Athletics the Australian Way. Melbourne : Lansdowne, 1971.
 The Lonely Breed, with Norman Harris.  London : Pelham, 1967.
 The Unforgiving Minute, as told to Alan Trengrove. London : Pelham, 1966.

See also
Olympic medalists in athletics
Mayor of the Gold Coast

References

External links

 
 
 Ron Clarke at the Athletics Australia Hall of Fame
 Ron Clarke at Australian Athletics Historical Results
 
 
 

1937 births
2015 deaths
Australian sportsperson-politicians
Athletes (track and field) at the 1964 Summer Olympics
Athletes (track and field) at the 1968 Summer Olympics
Australian male middle-distance runners
Australian male long-distance runners
World record setters in athletics (track and field)
Olympic athletes of Australia
Olympic bronze medalists for Australia
Athletes (track and field) at the 1962 British Empire and Commonwealth Games
Athletes (track and field) at the 1966 British Empire and Commonwealth Games
Athletes (track and field) at the 1970 British Commonwealth Games
Commonwealth Games silver medallists for Australia
Officers of the Order of Australia
Australian Members of the Order of the British Empire
People educated at Melbourne High School
Commonwealth Games medallists in athletics
Sport Australia Hall of Fame inductees
Mayors of Gold Coast
Medalists at the 1964 Summer Olympics
Recipients of the Australian Sports Medal
Recipients of the Centenary Medal
Athletes from Melbourne
Deaths from kidney failure
Olympic cauldron lighters
Olympic bronze medalists in athletics (track and field)
Track & Field News Athlete of the Year winners
BBC Sports Personality World Sport Star of the Year winners
Medallists at the 1962 British Empire and Commonwealth Games
Medallists at the 1966 British Empire and Commonwealth Games
Medallists at the 1970 British Commonwealth Games